Champions: New Millennium is a 1997 role-playing game supplement published by Hero Games and R. Talsorian Games for Champions.

Contents
Champions: New Millennium was a new edition of Champions using the Fuzion system.

Publication history
Shannon Appelcline explained that "Hero did embrace Fuzion, at least temporarily. They quickly released Champions: The New Millennium (1997), the fifth edition of their core Champions rulebook. However, it was so totally revamped that not only was there a fan revolt, but today New Millennium is largely ignored when counting Champions game editions." Appelcline continued by saying that "Hero Games got just a single book out during their Cybergames year: a new second edition of Champions: New Millennium (2000), now dual-statted for Fuzion and the Hero System — which had been Hero's plans for all their new products, following their departure from R. Talsorian."

Reception
The reviewer from Pyramid #28 (Nov./Dec., 1997) stated that "I think it's very reassuring that when the original creators of the classic Champions superhero roleplaying game decided to put out a new edition, they went the full nine. Champions: New Millennium is unlike any previous edition of Champions, with a radically changed gaming universe and brand new system."

Reviews
Arcane (Issue 19 - May 1997)
Alarums & Excursions (Issue 262 - Jun 1997)
Backstab #8

References

Champions (role-playing game) supplements
Role-playing game supplements introduced in 1997